Sébastien Loubsens (born 15 February 1973) is a French-born former Spanish rugby union player. He played as a centre.

Career
He evoluted to the highest level in Club athlétique Bordeaux-Bègles Gironde and ended his professional career on 2008, playing for Grenade Sur l'Adour. Currently he works as rugby pundit for Top 14 for Canal+.

International career
Before joining the Spain national team, he had several caps with France A and France 7s. He debuted for  Spain in 1999, during a test match against Japan at Tokyo, on 20 August 1999. He was part of the 1999 Rugby World Cup roster, where he played the first two matches for Spain. His last cap was against Andorra, at Andorra La Vella on 13 February 2005.

External links
 Sébastien Loubsens International Statistics
 Sébastien Loubsens at Rugbyrama (French)

1973 births
Living people
French rugby union players
Spanish rugby union players
French emigrants to Spain
Rugby union centres
Spain international rugby union players
CA Bordeaux-Bègles Gironde players
Stade Montois players
Oyonnax Rugby players